Joachim Maj (1932-2019) was an international speedway rider from Poland.

Speedway career 
Maj reached the final of the Speedway World Team Cup in the 1962 Speedway World Team Cup where he won a bronze medal.

World final appearances

World Team Cup
 1962 -  Slaný (with Marian Kaiser / Florian Kapała / Paweł Waloszek / Mieczysław Połukard) - 3rd - 20pts (4)
 1963 -  Vienna, Stadion Wien (with Andrzej Pogorzelski / Marian Kaiser / Henryk Żyto / Stanisław Tkocz) - 4th - 7pts (1)

References 

1932 births
2019 deaths
Polish speedway riders
People from Mikołów County